Minicom may be:

 The common British name for a telecommunications device for the deaf or textphone
 Minicom, a modem control and terminal emulation program
 Minicom Advanced Systems, a manufacturer of KVM Switches and Audio Video Distribution for Digital Signage